The 2008 Mobil 1 12 Hours of Sebring presented by Fresh from Florida was the 56th running of this event and the opening round of the 2008 American Le Mans Series season.  It took place at Sebring International Raceway, Florida on March 15, 2008.  Porsche was able to defeat Audi, marking the first loss for Audi at Sebring since 1999, while Porsche marks its first overall win at Sebring since 1988, the 20th anniversary since its last win.

The Porsche's win was also the first time in 14 years that the non-premier class of the race won the 12 Hours of Sebring overall, and the third time in history; it was also the first time an LMP2 car won the 12 Hours of Sebring since the race has become a part of the ALMS. The last time that the non-premier class won overall in Sebring was 1994, when Clayton Cunningham Racing, participating in the 1994 IMSA GT Championship season as a GTS-class entry, defeated the flagship World Sports Cars in a Nissan 300ZX.

Race results
Class winners in bold.  Cars failing to complete 70% of winner's distance marked as Not Classified (NC).

† - #15 Fernández Racing was disqualified from the race results after the car failed post-race inspection.  The car's airbox was found to have been broken, allowing an excess of air into the engine.

Statistics
 Pole Position - #1 Audi Sport North America - 1:43.195
 Fastest Lap - #07 Peugeot Sport Total - 1:44.536

References

Sebring
12 Hours Of Sebring, 2008
12 Hours of Sebring
12 Hours Of Sebring
12 Hours Of Sebring